Raymond Van Rumbecke was a Belgian boxer. He competed in the men's bantamweight event at the 1928 Summer Olympics. At the 1928 Summer Olympics, he lost to Carmelo Robledo of Argentina.

References

Year of birth missing
Year of death missing
Belgian male boxers
Olympic boxers of Belgium
Boxers at the 1928 Summer Olympics
Place of birth missing
Bantamweight boxers